Aleksandr Shadrin (4 September 1988 – 21 June 2014) was an Uzbekistani professional footballer of Russian descent who played as a striker for Lokomotiv Tashkent and the Uzbekistan national team.

Background
Shadrin was born to ethnic Russian and Korean parents in Muborak, Uzbek Soviet Socialist Republic, Soviet Union.

Club career

Mash'al Mubarek
In 2010, he signed a contract with Uzbek League club Mash'al Mubarek where he managed 1 goal in 19 games.

Navbahor Namangan
In 2011, he signed a one-year contract with Uzbek League club Navbahor Namangan.

International career
In 2011, he made his debut for the Uzbekistan national football team.

International goals
Scores and results list Uzbekistan's goal tally first.
Updated to games played 29 February 2012.

|}

Death
Shadrin died on 21 June 2014 while undergoing surgery on a gastric ulcer.

References 

1988 births
2014 deaths
Uzbekistani footballers
Russian footballers
Koryo-saram
Deaths from ulcers
Association football forwards
Uzbekistan international footballers
Russian expatriate footballers
Expatriate footballers in Uzbekistan
Russian expatriate sportspeople in Uzbekistan
Uzbekistani people of Russian descent
Navbahor Namangan players
Uzbekistani people of Korean descent
Russian people of Korean descent